A snowman is an anthropomorphic snow sculpture of a man often built in regions with sufficient snowfall and is a common winter tradition. In many places, typical snowmen consist of three large snowballs of different sizes with some additional accoutrements for facial and other features. Due to the sculptability of snow, there is also a wide variety of other styles. Common accessories include branches for arms and a smiley face made of stones, with a carrot used for a nose. Clothing, such as a hat or scarf, may be included. The low cost and common availability of materials mean snowmen are usually abandoned once completed.

Construction
Snow becomes most suitable for packing when it approaches its melting point and becomes moist and compact. Making a snowman of powdered snow is difficult since it will not stick to itself, and if the temperature of packing snow drops, it will form an unusable denser form of powdered snow called the crust.  Thus, a good time to build a snowman may be the next warm afternoon directly following a snowfall with a sufficient amount of snow. Using more compact snow allows for the construction of a large snowball by simply rolling it until it grows to the desired size.  If the snowball reaches the bottom of the grass it may pick up traces of grass, gravel, or dirt.

In North America, snowmen are generally built with three spheres representing the head, torso, and lower body.  In the United Kingdom, two spheres are used, one sphere representing the body and one representing the head. The usual practice is to then decorate and optionally dress the snowman. Sticks can be used for arms, and a face is traditionally made with stones or coal for eyes and a carrot for a nose. Some like to dress their snowmen in clothing such as a scarf or hat, while others prefer not to risk leaving supplies outdoors where they could easily be stolen or become stuck under melting ice.

There are variations to these standard forms; for instance, the popular song "Frosty the Snowman" describes a snowman being decorated with a corncob pipe, button nose, coal eyes and an old silk hat (usually depicted as a top hat). These other types range from snow columns to elaborate snow sculptures similar to ice sculptures.

One book describes classic snowman attachments as a black felt top hat, red scarf, coal eye pieces, carrot nose, and corn cob pipe.

History

Documentation of the first snowman is unclear. However, Bob Eckstein, author of The History of the Snowman, documented snowmen from the Middle Ages by researching artistic depictions in European museums, art galleries, and libraries. The earliest documentation he found was an antisemitic marginal illustration from a 1380 book of hours, found in the Koninklijke Bibliotheek in The Hague. The earliest known photograph of a snowman was taken circa 1853 by Welsh photographer Mary Dillwyn, the original of which is in the collections of the National Library of Wales.

While the origin of snowmen remains unclear, they have been used throughout history to make statements. In 1511, the city of Brussels held a snowman festival in hopes of appeasing its hungry and poor citizens. However, instead of building snowmen, the people built pornographic sculptures throughout the city. 

The concept of snowmen had made its way to North America by the Schenectady Massacre of 1690. It is said that on the night of the massacre, two guards who were in charge of guarding the north gate of the settlement of Schenectady built two snowmen to guard the gates while they went to the pub.

Snowmen became more mainstream when Frosty the Snowman came out in 1969, which originated from a song of the same name from 1950.

In popular culture

In media

Snowmen are a popular theme for Christmas and winter decorations and also in children's media. A famous snowman character is Frosty, the titular snowman in the popular holiday song "Frosty the Snowman" (later adapted into film and television specials), who was magically brought to life by the old silk hat used on his head. In addition to numerous related music and other media for Frosty, snow-men also feature as:
Bouli, a French animated series about a snowman's adventures in a magical place.
Der Schneemann, a 1943 animated short film created in Germany.
Doc McStuffins features a plush snowman named Chilly.
The Peanuts comic strip has a number of strips where the characters build snowmen in the winter months.  One memorable serial has the gang forbidden to build snowmen because they lack the necessary government permits.  Defiantly, Charlie Brown builds an unauthorized snowman in the middle of the night to serve as a test case.
Jack Frost, a 1997 horror film in which a serial killer is transformed into a snowman.
Jack Frost, a 1998 movie with Michael Keaton in which he wakes up as a snowman after a car accident.
Oswald features a snowman named Johnny who runs an ice cream shop.
The Snowman, British picture book (1978) by Raymond Briggs and animation (1982) directed by Dianne Jackson about a boy who builds a snowman that comes alive and takes him to the North Pole.
Calvin and Hobbes, an American cartoon by Bill Watterson, contains many instances of Calvin building snowmen, many of which are deformed or otherwise abnormal, often used to poke fun at the art world.
 Hans Christian Andersen wrote a winter fairy story, The Snowman.
 Dennis Jürgensen's horror story "The Snowman", about a boy traumatized by being locked in a meat freezer.
 R. L. Stine's Goosebumps story titled "Beware, the Snowman" featured a monstrous snowman.
 The 2013 film Frozen features a living snowman named Olaf who longs to see summer. The film score includes a song about building a snowman.

Snowman-themed items
Snowmen can also be a theme for toys, costumes, and decorations. They have been featured on New Year stamps, for example, in Russia and other post-Soviet states.

One common time for snowman-themed decorations is during the winter holiday and Christmas season, where it is celebrated. One craft book suggested a plan making a small snowman doll out of white glove, ribbon, and other craft supplies.

One book on snowmen, which included instructions on working with real snow, also mentions snowman-themed sweets and confections. Some options for snowman-themed dessert items include ice cream, marshmallows, and macaroons.

Giant snowmen and records

In 2015, a man from the U.S. State of Wisconsin was noted for making a large snowman 22 feet tall and with a base 12 feet wide.

The record for the world's largest snowman or snowwoman was set in 2008 in Bethel, Maine.

The previous record was a snowman built in Bethel, Maine, in February 1999. The snowman was named "Angus, King of the Mountain" in honor of the then-current governor of Maine, Angus King.

A large snowman known as "Snowzilla" has been built each winter in Anchorage, Alaska.

In December 2016 the smallest snowman of sorts was created in a nano-fabrication facility at University of Western Ontario. It consisted of three roughly 0.9 micron spheres of silica, platinum arms and nose, and a face made by an ion beam.

Variations
In addition to snowmen, other things can be made from snow. Typical variations on the snowman concept involve producing other snow creatures or snow decorations.

A snow sculpture of a woman is called a snowwoman.

The Yuki Cone, named after the Japanese word for snow, involves building a small cone-shaped structure from snowballs, illuminated from the inside with a tea-light.

Sometimes other raw material might be used to create objects that mimic the snowman concept.

Japan 
In Japanese, snowmen are called "Yukidaruma". Possibly because the shape is related to a Daruma doll, they usually only have two sections instead of three. There is also a longstanding tradition in Japan of creating snow rabbits, or "Yukiusagi".

Unicode

See also
 Snow sculpture
 Inuksuk

References

Further reading
Eckstein, Bob The History of the Snowman: From the Ice Age to the Flea Market at Internet Archive. New York, Simon Spotlight Entertainment, 2007 
Davis, Scottie Snow Day, A Photographic Journal of the Best Snowmen (2004).

14th-century establishments
Buildings and structures made of snow or ice
Types of sculpture
Play (activity)
Christmas characters
Snow sculpture